Omid Farokhzad (born 1969) is an Iranian-American physician, scientist, and entrepreneur in the development of nanomedicines. Farokhzad is a Professor of Anesthesiology at Harvard Medical School. Omid Farokhzad is the Chair, Chief Executive Officer and co-founder for Seer, a company focused on deep, unbiased proteomics analysis at scale. The Boston Globe selected him among the top innovators in Massachusetts and the Boston Business Journal selected him among the Health Care Champions for his innovations.

He has also served as an associate editor for ACS Nano an international forum for the communication of comprehensive articles on nanoscience and nanotechnology research at the interfaces of chemistry, biology, materials science, physics, and engineering. He is widely recognized as leader in the field of nanomedicine  and drug delivery.

In 2016, he was the recipient of the Ellis Island Medal of Honor. He was also elected in the National Academy of Inventors in 2018.

Career 
Farokhzad completed his residency in Anesthesiology and fellowship in Pain Medicine at the Brigham and Women Hospital and Harvard Medical School. He completed a post-doctoral research training with Professor Robert Langer at MIT in the Harvard-MIT Program of Health Sciences and Technology. He joined Harvard Medical School in 2004 as a faculty member, after his clinical training, he served as Professor of Anesthesia.

He has popularized the usage of specific targeting agents for the delivery of chemotherapy agents to cancerous cells found within a cancer patient. Beyond cancerous phenotype he has addressed atherosclerosis-related disease, He has demonstrated the usage of targeted biodegradable nano ‘drones’ that delivered a special type of drug that promotes healing.  This remodeling of the plaque environment would be predicted in humans to block plaque rupture and thrombosis and prevent heart attacks and strokes.

Farokhzad founded Seer, Inc. (Nasdaq: SEER) in 2017 to advance transformative proteomics platform that uses nanoparticles to analyze the protein compositions of a sample.

References 

1969 births
Living people